Mill Creek is a stream in Montgomery County in the U.S. state of Missouri.

Mill Creek (also called "Mill Branch") was named for a watermill near its course.

See also
List of rivers of Missouri

References

Rivers of Montgomery County, Missouri
Rivers of Missouri